Youwarou Cercle  is an administrative subdivision of the Mopti Region of Mali. The administrative center (chef-lieu) is the town of Youwarou.

The cercle is divided into seven communes:
Bimbéré Tama
Déboye
Dirma
Dongo
Farimaké
N'Dodjiga
Youwarou

References

Cercles of Mali
Ségou Region